Hugo Osvald (1892–1970) was a Swedish botanist and plant ecologist specialized on mire ecology, Sphagnum and peat formation.

Osvald participated in the Third International Phytogeographic Excursion to Switzerland in 1923.

References

1892 births
1970 deaths
20th-century Swedish botanists
20th-century Swedish geologists
Plant ecologists
Members of the Första kammaren